Hinton St George is a village and parish in Somerset, England, situated  outside Crewkerne,  south west of Yeovil in the South Somerset district.  The village has a population of 442.

It has a wide main street lined with hamstone cottages, some thatched.  The village has a thriving shop.  The village does not lie on a major road, and has a few holiday cottages and second homes.

History

The parish was part of the hundred of Crewkerne.

Much of the development of the village occurred under the lords Poulett extending their large house and estate (Hinton House). By the 1560s the three open arable fields had been enclosed and two large estates of 74 and  created, based on the now disappeared hamlet of Craft. The park contained deer and orchards, with cherry trees

It is a scheduled monument and Grade II* listed building.

Governance

The parish council has responsibility for local issues, including setting an annual precept (local rate) to cover the council's operating costs and producing annual accounts for public scrutiny. The parish council evaluates local planning applications and works with the local police, district council officers, and neighbourhood watch groups on matters of crime, security, and traffic. The parish council's role also includes initiating projects for the maintenance and repair of parish facilities, as well as consulting with the district council on the maintenance, repair, and improvement of highways, drainage, footpaths, public transport, and street cleaning. Conservation matters (including trees and listed buildings) and environmental issues are also the responsibility of the council.

The village falls within the Non-metropolitan district of South Somerset, which was formed on 1 April 1974 under the Local Government Act 1972, having previously been part of Chard Rural District. The district council is responsible for local planning and building control, local roads, council housing, environmental health, markets and fairs, refuse collection and recycling, cemeteries and crematoria, leisure services, parks, and tourism.

Somerset County Council is responsible for running the largest and most expensive local services such as education, social services, libraries, main roads, public transport, policing and fire services, trading standards, waste disposal and strategic planning.

It is also part of the Yeovil county constituency represented in the House of Commons of the Parliament of the United Kingdom. It elects one Member of Parliament (MP) by the first past the post system of election.

Church

In Hinton St George is the Church of St George. It includes 13th century work by masons of Wells Cathedral. The vestry and north chapel of 1814 are said to be by James Wyatt, however it is more likely to be by Jeffry Wyatt, (later Sir Jeffry Wyattville). The four-stage tower is dated to 1485–95. It is supported by full-height offset corner buttresses, and has battlemented parapets with quatrefoil panels below merlons on the corner and intermediate pinnacles. The weathervane was added in 1756 by Thomas Bagley of Bridgwater. There is a hexagonal south-east corner stair turret. Stage 2 has small light on the north side and a statue niche on the south. All the faces on the two upper stages 2-light mullioned, transomed and traceried window under pointed arched labels, with pierced stone baffles. The clockface is under the east window. During restoration work the parapet of the tower was examined and a stone was discovered with a carved date of 1731 which suggests that the decorative parapet may have been added then. The tracery on the north side has been marked out but never cut. In general there is little sign of more than one phase of construction although repairs are evident.

Culture
 Punkie Night is celebrated in the village each October.

References

External links
 http://www.hintonstgeorge.org.uk

Villages in South Somerset
Civil parishes in Somerset